Jules Culot (2 November 1861, Baccarat – 17 September 1933, Geneva ) was a French entomologist and an entomological illustrator who specialised in Coleoptera and Lepidoptera.

His Coleoptera collection is held by the Natural History Museum of Geneva. His Lepidoptera collection was given to his daughters and their present location is unknown. He wrote Noctuelles et géomètres d'Europe. Volumes I-IV. Genève, Villa les Iris (1909–1913, 1917–1919) online, an illustrated revision of the Noctuidae (with 81 plates) and the Geometridae (with 70 plates) of Europe. 
Jules Culot was a friend of Charles Oberthur.

References
Pictet, A. 1934: [Culot, J.] Mitteilungen der Schweizerischen Entomologischen Gesellschaft, Zürich 16:129–139, Portr. + Schr.verz.
Wüest, J. 1996: [Culot, J.] Bulletin Romand d'Entomologie, Genève 14 (2) 124
Wüest, J. 2001: [Culot, J.] Bulletin Romand d'Entomologie, Genève 19 (2)

External links
 

French lepidopterists
1861 births
1933 deaths
People from Meurthe-et-Moselle
19th-century French zoologists
20th-century French zoologists
Scientific illustrators